Naresha Malla (died 1644), often referred to as Naresh or Narindra, was a Malla Dynasty King of Bhaktapur, Nepal from 1637 to 1644. He was succeeded by his son Jagat Prakasha Malla in 1644.

References

Malla rulers of Bhaktapur
1644 deaths
Year of birth unknown
People from Bhaktapur
17th-century Nepalese people